The Zacatal Bridge is located southwest of Ciudad del Carmen, in the state of Campeche in Mexico. It connects the Atasta peninsula and the Isla del Carmen.

This is the longest bridge in the state and at the time of opening the longest in Mexico with a length of 3,861 m and a width of 9.00 m. It is a two-lane road bridge for the Federal Highway 180. It is one of the busiest in the country since it is the gateway to the Yucatán Peninsula.

The superstructure is composed entirely of prefabricated elements to base being: 121 heads of precast concrete, 496 Type IV girders Aastha amended and 8 box girders well as 124 post-tensioned concrete slabs. It was completed in October 1994.

External links

Bridges in Mexico
Buildings and structures in Campeche
Gulf Coast of Mexico